The Tata Estate was a station wagon car produced by Indian car manufacturer Tata Motors (then known as Tata Engineering) between 1992 until 2000. 

Tata was already a major player in the heavy vehicle segment and the Estate was the company's first attempt at building a passenger car. The car was considered fairly advanced during its production time and had many features which were not common among other Indian cars available at the same price range then. The car came with power windows, power steering and a tachometer. 

The Estate's exterior is based on Mercedes-Benz station wagon design made at the time of conception, in particular the T-series estate-type cars.

History

The Tata Estate was introduced in 1992 and production ran until 2000.

The Estate followed after the production of the Tata Sierra in 1991. It was initially plagued with problems due to high fuel consumption, faulty electrical systems and suspensions before they were  fixed in subsequent productions.

Specifications
The platform of the Estate was based on the Tata Telcoline pick-up truck, which saved the company around Rs. 10 crore (at that time) in development costs.

References

Further reading

 Sen, Gautem. (2014). Million Cars for Billion People: The Story of India's 'Millionaire' Cars. Mumbai, India: Platinum Press. 

Estate
1990s cars
2000s cars